Amra 2GayTher is a 2021 Bengali language Romance and Comedy web series written and directed by Abhijit Guha and Sudeshna Roy. The series was released on 24 December 2021.

Plot 
A boy in love wants to marry, but his father is furious and doesn't agree with his decision. This is a narrative that is fairly common. The boy's choice in Aamra2Gayther, though, is what distinguishes it. He wants to marry the well-known radio personality, who also happens to be a male and is his best friend. When he takes a choice like this, it drives his female coworker crazy and his father crazy, but his mother supports him, she leaves the house with him, and he now has to face the difficulties of starting again.

Cast 
Indrasish Roy
Anindya Chatterjee
Sudipta Chakraborty
Pujarini Ghosh
Poulami Das
Sudip Mukherje 
Pallavi Chatterjee
RJ Ayantika

Episodes

References

External links 
 

2021 films
Indian romance films
Bengali-language web series